Sonik Kicks is the eleventh studio album from Paul Weller, an English singer-songwriter and former member of The Jam; it was released on 19 March 2012. The album reached number one on the UK Albums Chart beating David Guetta's Nothing But the Beat to the top spot by just 250 copies.

Singles
"Starlite" was the first single released from the album, as a download and vinyl 12" in August 2011, it reached #113 in the UK Singles Chart.

"That Dangerous Age" was released in March 2012 as a CD, vinyl 7" and download, peaking at #66 in the UK. It was performed live on The Jonathan Ross Show.

"Birthday" was released as a non-album download single in August 2012, peaking at #64 in the UK Singles Chart.

Track listing
Standard listing
 "Green" (Weller, Dine) - 3:03
 "The Attic" (Weller, Dine) - 2:15
 "Kling I Klang" (Weller, Dine) - 3:14
 "Sleep of the Serene" (Weller, Ibrahim, Rees) - 2:00
 "By The Waters" (Weller, Ibrahim) - 3:29
 "That Dangerous Age" (Weller, Dine) - 2:30
 "Study in Blue" (Weller, Dine) - 6:37
 "Dragonfly" (Paul Weller, Jasmine Weller, Dine) - 3:41
 "When Your Garden's Overgrown" (Weller, Dine) - 3:11
 "Around The Lake" (Weller, Dine) - 2:11
 "Twilight" (Weller, Cradock) - 0:20
 "Drifters" (Weller, Cradock, Dine) - 3:07
 "Paperchase" (Weller, Dine) - 5:01
 "Be Happy Children" (Weller, Dine) - 2:45

Bonus Tracks (Deluxe Edition)

 "Starlite" (Weller, Dine) - 3:41
 "Devotion" (Weller) - 4:01

Personnel
 Paul Weller - Lead Vocals, Electric Guitars, Bass, Drums, Piano, Mellotron, Hammond, Farfisa, Moogs, Percussion, Acoustic Guitars, Backing Vocals
 Graham Coxon - Electric Guitars
 Steve Cradock - Electric Guitars, Drums, Acoustic Guitars, Backing Vocals
 Andy Crofts - Electric Guitars, Bass, Acoustic Guitars, Celeste, Vibes, Glockenspiel, Vibraphone, Farfisa, Backing Vocals, String Arrangements
 Simon Dine - Electric Guitars, Loops, FX, Electronic Strings
 Noel Gallagher - Electric Guitars, Bass, Acoustic Guitars
 Ben Gordelier - Drums
 Aziz Ibrahim - Acoustic Guitars
 Jan "Stan" Kybert - Programming
 Andy Lewis - Bass, Celeste, Vibes, Glockenspiel
 Marco Nelson - Bass
 David Nock - Drums
 Roger "Trotwood" Nowell - Bass
 Sean O'Hagan - String Arrangements
 Steve Pilgrim - Drums, Backing Vocals
 Charles Rees - Drums, Percussion
 Hannah Weller - Backing Vocals
 Leah Weller - Backing Vocals
 Mac Weller - Backing Vocals
Technical
Charles Rees, Jamie Johnson - engineer, recording
Alex Hutchinson, Paul Weller - design
Julian Broad - photography

Charts

Weekly charts

Year-end charts

Release history

References

External links 
 Sonik Kicks at Amazon
 Sonik Kicks at Discogs.

Paul Weller albums
2012 albums
Island Records albums